La Raza is a Spanish newspaper and news website, published in Chicago, Illinois by La Raza Chicago, Inc. It is a free newspaper distributed in Chicago and its metropolitan area, mostly directly to homes in Hispanic neighborhoods and also in street boxes and stores.

Founded in 1970 by Alfredo Torres de Jesús, in 1972 it was purchased by César Dovalina and later, in late 1983 by Luis Heber Rossi, a businessman and music promoter in Chicago. During Rossi's tenure La Raza became one of the most important and recognized Spanish publications in the United States. 

Since November 2004, La Raza is part of ImpreMedia, publisher of the Spanish newspapers La Opinión and El Diario NY, and other digital properties.

La Raza reports and inform about key issues for the Chicago Latino community, with special focus in the challenges, fights, successes and possibilities of the Hispanic population of the city and its civic organizations. La Raza has been recognized in several occasions as the Best Hispanic Weekly of the US by the National Association of Hispanic Publications' Jose Martí Awards Awards, among dozens of other awards granted by that organization.

La Raza has been also recognized by Editor & Publisher magazine ('10 Newspapers That Do It Right 2015') and has received grants in support of its journalism awarded by the Field Foundation of Illinois, the Robert R. McCormick  Foundation, the Chicago Community Trust, the Facebook Journalism Project/Lenfest Institute, the Facebook Sustainability Accelerator/ICFJ and the Google News Initiative.

Currently, La Raza newspaper is part of the Chicago Independent Media Alliance and has participated in projects led by the Institute for Nonprofit News such as Lens on Lightfoot (dedicated to analyze the first year of the administration of Chicago Mayor Lori Lightfoot). It is also part of the Solving for Chicago journalism collaborative led by the Local Media Association.

Jesús Del Toro is La Raza's current Director and Editor in Chief.

Reference section

External links section 
La Raza website

See also 

 List of Spanish-language newspapers published in the United States

Newspapers published in Chicago
Spanish-language_newspapers_published_in_the_United_States
Hispanic_and_Latino_American_culture_in_Chicago